Weynay Ghebresilasie (born 24 March 1994 in Gheza Hamle, Eritrea) is an Eritrean born runner, competing for Great Britain as of February 2021, who specializes in the 3000 metres steeplechase. He competed in that event at the 2012 Summer Olympics, coming tenth in his heat, and was the flag bearer of the Eritrean team. He also placed sixth at the 2012 World Junior Championships in Athletics that year.

Subsequent to the Olympics, he sought political asylum in the United Kingdom. He joined Sunderland Harriers & Athletic Club and on 31 January 2021 became eligible to represent Great Britain in international competition.

References 

1994 births
Living people
Eritrean male steeplechase runners
Eritrean male long-distance runners
Eritrean male middle-distance runners
Athletes (track and field) at the 2012 Summer Olympics
Olympic athletes of Eritrea
Eritrean refugees
Eritrean emigrants to the United Kingdom